Iwo is a City in Osun State, Nigeria. The Iwo people, like all other people of the Yoruba kingdom, are said to have originated from Ile-Ife - where they migrated sometimes in the 14th century according to Alademomi kenyon and Prince Adelegan Adegbola (2009). The only predicted land with the symbol of the parrots (which signifies the location of the promised land) is the Iwo kingdom. The city was formerly part of old Oyo state and was later separated and became one of the major townships in Osun State, Nigeria.

It has over 30 ancient and powerful Kings all under the Oluwo of Iwoland, HRM Oba Abdulrosheed Akanbi as the only Consenting Authority and first class paramount Ruler  in an area of 245 km² and a population of 191,348 (central city/Local Government) most populous Local Government in Osun State by the 2006 Nigeria National census figures. The other local governments in Iwo from satellite towns are Aiyedire Local Government, 265.783 km² area and 76,309 by population, as well as Ola-Oluwa Local Government, 332.117 km² area and 76,227 by population. The Headquarters of the Local Governments are Iwo (Central), Iwo; Aiyedire, Ile Ogbo; and Ola-Oluwa, Bode-Osi. Iwo now has additional four (4) Local Governments: Iwo East, Olomowewe; Iwo West, Agberire; Ọla Oluwa South East, Ilemowu; Ayedire South East, Oluponna.

Education

The source of orthodox Education in Iwo was, initially, primarily Christian Missionary based. These were mostly Baptist as each Baptist Church branch in the central city established a primary school of its own with corresponding name after the branch: Aipate Baptist Day School, Olukotun Baptist Day School, Feesu Baptist Day School, Oke-Odo Baptist Day School. The Baptists also established a secondary school, Baptist High school, Iwo, the only institution in Iwo awarding Advanced Level of West African School Certificate in addition to the Ordinary Level certificate. There was also a Baptist Modern school (now obsolete in Nigeria educational system) which now metamorphosed to Baptist Grammar school - awarding ordinary level certificates like other secondary schools. These in addition to the old Baptist College, a Teacher Training College, and one of the oldest of such in Africa and main source of teachers to the Nigerian and other African countries Education system. The College is now the site of Bowen University, the secular Baptist University, and the one of the three University in Iwo and environment. 
The Baptists were followed by the Methodist who had a Methodist Primary School in the central city, as well a Modern school, now United Methodist High School.

The Catholics had a Modern School, now Catholic Grammar School, and a Female Secondary School- St. Marys High School which is now a co-educational school.

The government later joined the Christian missionaries in establishing many primary schools, a Modern School, Local authority Modern School, now Local Authority Commercial Grammar School, a Teacher Training College, LATCO, later changed in 1964 to Iwo Grammar School.

Muslim missionaries also joined the efforts later in establishing Ansar-U-deen Primary School, Ansar-U-Deen Modern School which is now Ansar-U-deen Grammar School, and  Anwar-ul-Islam Grammar School. The first Shariah court in Nigeria was established in Iwo.
Iwo people are majorly Muslim as early as 1655 when the first mosque in Yorubaland was built which serves as the first place of worship and Islamic education.
Among the major secondary schools are the Iwo Grammar School, the United Methodist High School, the Baptist High School, St. Mary's High School, the L.A. Commercial Grammar School, Islahudeen Grammar School and the Anwar-ul-Islam Grammar School as well as several others. Iwo is well noted for Arabic/Islamic  education.  There are several Arabic schools (Modrassah)in the City and many Iwo indigenes usually have a taste of this   along with the secular schools. The popular Modrassah include Islamic youth center (morkaz shabaab) which was established by late Islamic scholar named Sheikh Ahmad Muhally Adedimeji Aroworeki, Islahudeen Arabic School, Obatedo,  founded by late Sheikh Abdulbaaqi Muhammad in the early 1960s. Amin Training Center, Araromi is another prominent school established by late  Sheikh Badrudeen Al-Amin in the 1950s. Islamic cultural center (Markaz Abdul Razaq Abdul Rahman), Sheik Adam ilory Villa, Agbowo, Iwo.

There are many primary schools in the satellite towns established by the former Western Regional Government as well as many secondary schools in Iwo and its satellite towns which were established during the tenure of Chief Bola Ige as the governor of the old Oyo state.

Higher Institutions: BOWEN University,  Wolex Polytechni c, Baptist Teachers' Training College which was located at Oke Odo in Iwo, but this facility is now used as the campus of Bowen University, Westland University, Iwo city polytechnic, Royal College of Public Health and Technology, Empire College of Health Technology, Al Ummah College of Education, Federal College of Education, Offer center institute of Agriculture. Another institution in Iwo is Shariah College of Nigeria, which used to be in Ibadan before it was relocated to its permanent site at Oke-Afo, Iwo.

Among the major private secondary schools are Islamic Model College, Muslim International School, Agbaje Memorial Comprehensive College, Aipate Baptist School, Vico-Hope Comprehensive College, A-1 Grammar School, Crowey Schools, Regina Mundi Girls Secondary School, The wings school, Innayatullah muslim academy, ICC Model school, Our Lady of Fatima academy (OLFA). etc.

Technology

Iwo is the home for the first state television in Nigeria which is founded 40 years ago, Reality Television Service (RTS), It is just 21yrs that the NTA Ibadan is used to be older than it. It is also the home of Reality Radiovision Services (RRS), it's also known as odidere fm or 96.3Fm. Also iwo also have Bowen Radio 101.9fm and an old radio station at ori eru Iwo Am which was abandoned by osun state government.There is also a new radio station in Iwo Ayekooto Fm, 88.3fm

Agriculture

Iwo is a home to Osun State Agricultural Development Programmes (OSSADEP), also selema farm s, shabeeb agro and many more.

Community based organisations

Among the leading community based organisations in Iwo are; Iwo Board of Trustees (IBOT), Iwo Action Council (IWAC), Iwo Progressive Union (IPU), Iwoland Development Coalition (IDC),Guildance Community Development Foundation, Charitable Youth for Nation Building Initiative among others.
Iwo Action Council (IWAC) is the umbrella body of all organisations in Iwo. IWAC has been known for being in the forefront as developmental focus organisation.

Iwoland Development Coalition (IDC) was formed on 29 August 2014 to champion development of Iwo, Aiyedire and Ola Oluwa Local Government. IDC currently have members in countries like: Kuwait, Saudi Arabia, Qatar,  Côte d'Ivoire, France, United States of America, United Kingdom etc. IDC though is still a new organisation but has succeeded in establishing health clinic at Akinbami in Aiyedire Local Government, reconstructed culvert at Ojude Oba in Iwo, staged schools tour in Iwo, Aiyedire and Ola Oluwa Local Governments, award scholarship to students in need, rehabilitate Yidi Oba culvert, organised lectures on burning issues, distributed over 8,000 health books (containing useful information on how to take care of pregnant and Children), organised widows empowerment programme, provide nutritional support to orphans and vulnerable children, take care of people with disabilities, researched the history of Iwoland, administered Vitamin A and Abendazole for the benefit of children of ages 0 and 5 years, patched pot holes from Adeeke and Kajola road, cleaned and painted Iwo roundabout, organised health outreach, assisted Local Authority Grammar School to transport chairs from Iwo Grammar School and payment of WAEC examination of 6 students two each from Iwo, Aiyedire and Ola Oluwa Local Government.

Iwo Chamber of Commerce and Industry Limited/GTE

People of like minds who are interested in economic development of Iwoland came together in 2018 to form Iwo Chamber of Commerce and Industry Limited/GTE. The organization was registered with Corporate Affairs Commission in 2021 which is completely different from the defunct one established in 1989.
Iwo Chamber of Commerce and Industry was established for the promotion and protection of trade and industry and to represent and express the opinion of the business community on matters affecting trade and industry in Iwoland which consists of the three local government areas in the federal constituency (Iwo, Ayedire and Ola Oluwa) Iwoland Federal constituency and where applicable, the whole State of Osun and the Federation. It is a not –for- profit –sharing organization and its income and properties are applied solely for the promotion of ICCI’s objectives.
Among those people that make it happen then are: Mr Olusegun Dada (Esq),Mr Kudaisi Ismaila (Esq), Mr Olawale Rasheed, Senator Adelere Oriolowo, Alhaji Mokanju Musibau FCA, Professor Waheed Hassan, Otunba Jire Ayinla, Akogun Olaposi Adiatu,  Adebayo Lasisi PhD, FCA, Mr Kabiru Adisa FCA, Lanre Omotayo PhD, Princess Funmi Lamuye among others.

List of Iwo Local Government Chairmen from 1989 Till Date

Chief Blarinwa                                           1989-1989
Chief Ganiyu Iromini                                     1993-1994
Barrister Gbadegeshin Adedeji                            1994-1996
Mr Kamilu Adio                                           1996-1997
Honourable Mutiu Kareem                                  1999-2002
Honourable Moshood Adeoti                                2002-2003
Honourable Rasaki Ajadi Salwu                            2003-2006
Engineer Lasun Olaniyi                                   2006-2007
Honourable Sulaimon Bello                                2007-2010
Honourable Kamo Olabisi Alao                             2010-2016
Honourable Kamorudeen Raji                               2017-2021
Honourable Ishola Kamar Adeniyi                          2021 to date

External links

References

Local Government Areas in Osun State
Cities in Yorubaland
Cities in Nigeria